Sayabec station is a Via Rail station in Sayabec, Quebec, Canada. Located on Rue Boulay (Route 132), it is a flag stop with no ticket service. Sayabec is served by Via Rail's  Ocean; the Montreal – Gaspé train was suspended in 2013. Both trains share the same rail line between Montreal and Matapédia.

The old building of the Canadian National Railway station is a designated Heritage Railway Station. It has been renovated and relocated from its original location to a park in Sayabec. It now serves as a meeting hall and provides touristic information.

References

External links

Via Rail page for the Ocean
Via Rail page for the Montreal – Gaspé train

Via Rail stations in Quebec
Designated Heritage Railway Stations in Quebec
Railway stations in Bas-Saint-Laurent
Heritage buildings of Quebec